Whited is a surname. Notable people with the surname include:

Ed Whited (born 1964), American baseball player
Marvin Whited (1918–1957), American football offensive guard
Thomas Whited (1751-1851), American Revolutionary War soldier

See also

Whited Township, Kanabec County, Minnesota, United States
Whited Inlet, inlet of Antarctica